The following is a complete list of orchestral suites by Christoph Graupner (1683-1760), the German harpsichordist and composer of high Baroque music.  The works appear as given in Christoph Graupner : Thematisches Verzeichnis der Musikalischen Werke  (thematic catalogue of Graupner's instrumental works). Apart from the string orchestra composed of 2 violins, viola and basso continuo, the additional instruments mentioned in the title of the work often play solo and ripieno parts.

List of orchestral suites
 GWV 401 — Suite for 3 chalumeaux solo in C major
 GWV 402 — Suite for strings in C major
 GWV 403 — Suite for strings in C major
 GWV 404 — Suite for strings in C major
 GWV 405 — Suite for strings in C major
 GWV 406 — Suite for strings in C major
 GWV 407 — Suite for chalumeau & bassoon in C major
 GWV 408 — Suite for 2 oboes in C major
 GWV 409 — Suite for 3 chalumeaux in C major
 GWV 410 — Suite for 2 trumpets in C major
 GWV 411 — Suite for strings in C minor
 GWV 412 — Suite for strings in C minor
 GWV 413 — Suite for strings in C minor
 GWV 414 — Suite for strings in D major
 GWV 415 — Suite for strings in D major
 GWV 416 — Suite for strings in D major
 GWV 417 — Entrata per la Musica di Tavola for 2 flutes in D major
 GWV 418 — Suite for 2 flutes in D major
 GWV 419 — Suite for oboe d'amore & viola d'amore in D major
 GWV 420 — Suite for 2 trumpets in D major
 GWV 421 — Suite for 2 trumpets in D major
 GWV 422 — Suite for 2 trumpets in D major
 GWV 423 — Suite for 2 trumpets in D major
 GWV 424 — Overture in D major
 GWV 425 — Suite for strings in D minor
 GWV 426 — Suite for viola d'amore in D minor
 GWV 427 — Suite for viola d'amore in D minor
 GWV 428 — Suite for 3 chalumeaux in D minor
 GWV 429 — Suite for strings in E flat major
 GWV 430 — Suite for 2 oboes in E flat major
 GWV 431 — Suite for 2 flutes & 2 oboes in E flat major
 GWV 432 — Suite for strings in E major
 GWV 433 — Suite for strings in E major
 GWV 434 — Suite for strings in E major
 GWV 435 — Suite for flauto d'amore in E major
 GWV 436 — Suite for flute in E major
 GWV 437 — Suite for oboe d'amore in E major
 GWV 438 — Suite for viola d'amore in E major
 GWV 439 — Suite for 2 oboes d'amore in E major
 GWV 440 — Suite for flauto d'amore & oboe d'amore in E major
 GWV 441 — Suite for strings in E minor
 GWV 442 — Suite for 2 oboes di selva in E minor
 GWV 443 — Suite for 3 chalumeaux solo in F major
 GWV 444 — Entrata per la Musica di Tavola for strings in F major
 GWV 445 — Suite for strings in F major
 GWV 446 — Suite for strings in F major
 GWV 447 — Suite for recorder in F major
 GWV 448 — Suite for 2 chalumeaux in F major
 GWV 449 — Suite for 3 chalumeaux in F major
 GWV 450 — Suite for flute, viola d'amore & chalumeau in F major
 GWV 451 — Suite for flute, viola d'amore, 2 chalumeaux & horn in F major
 GWV 452 — Suite for 2 chalumeaux & 2 horns in F major
 GWV 453 — Entrata per la Musica di Tavola for strings in G major
 GWV 454 — Suite for strings in G major
 GWV 455 — Suite for strings in G major
 GWV 456 — Suite for strings in G major
 GWV 457 — Suite for strings in G major
 GWV 458 — Suite for viola d'amore in G major
 GWV 459 — Suite for viola d'amore in G major
 GWV 460 — Suite for viola d'amore in G major
 GWV 461 — Suite for viola d'amore in G major
 GWV 462 — Suite for 2 flutes in G major
 GWV 463 — Suite for flauto d'amore & oboe d'amore in G major
 GWV 464 — Suite for flute & bassoon in G major
 GWV 465 — Suite for viola d'amore in G major
 GWV 466 — Suite for 2 hunting horns in G major
 GWV 467 — Suite for 2 flutes & 2 horns in G major
 GWV 468 — Entrata per la Musica di Tavola for strings in G minor
 GWV 469 — Suite for strings in G minor
 GWV 470 — Suite for 2 flutes in G minor
 GWV 471 — Suite for 2 flutes & 2 oboes in G minor
 GWV 472 — Entrata per la Musica di Tavola for strings in A major
 GWV 473 — Suite for strings in A major
 GWV 474 — Suite for strings in A major
 GWV 475 — Suite for strings in A major
 GWV 476 — Suite for viola d'amore in A major
 GWV 477 — Suite for flauto d'amore, oboe d'amore & viola d'amore in A major
 GWV 478 — Suite for flute in A minor
 GWV 479 — Suite for strings in B flat major
 GWV 480 — Suite for strings in B flat major
 GWV 481 — Suite for strings in B flat major
 GWV 482 — Suite for strings in B flat major
 GWV 483 — Suite for strings in B flat major
 GWV 484 — Suite for chalumeau in B flat major
 GWV 485 — Suite for flute in B flat major
 GWV 729 — Suite for viola d'amore in A major

See also
 List of cantatas by Christoph Graupner
 List of symphonies by Christoph Graupner
 List of harpsichord pieces by Christoph Graupner
 List of concertos by Christoph Graupner
 List of chamber pieces by Christoph Graupner

Selected discography
 Graupner: Suites for chalumeaux. Mensa Sonora, orchestra. Jean Maillet, conductor. (Pierre Verany label 794114)
 Graupner: Music for chalumeau. Graupner Ensemble. (Vox Temporis 92009)

References

External links
Graupner GWV-online a digital Graupner Werkverzeichnis with integrated search function
Extensive online bibliography for research on Christoph Graupner
ULB Library  Graupner's music manuscripts and archives in Darmstadt, Germany
Kim Patrick Clow's webpage dedicated to promoting Graupner's work.

 Christoph Graupner's works at La Sinfonie d'Orphée

Orchestral suites
Orchestral suites by Christoph Graupner
Orchest